Blayke Brailey (born 23 September 1998) is an Australian rugby league footballer who plays as a  for the Cronulla-Sutherland Sharks in the NRL.

Background
Brailey was born in Sydney, Australia.

He played his junior rugby league for the Aquinas Colts. His older brother Jayden plays for the Newcastle Knights in the National Rugby League.

Playing career

2018
Brailey played for Cronulla's feeder club side Newtown in the 2018 Intrust Super Premiership NSW grand final against Canterbury-Bankstown at Leichhardt Oval which Newtown lost 18–12.

2019
Brailey made his first grade debut in round 1 of the 2019 NRL season against the Newcastle Knights.

Brailey played for Cronulla's feeder side Newtown in their Canterbury Cup NSW grand final victory over the Wentworthville Magpies at Bankwest Stadium.  Newtown won the match 20–15 after extra-time.
The following week, Brailey played in the NRL State Championship final for Newtown against the Burleigh Bears at ANZ Stadium which Newtown won on the final siren after trailing Burleigh 16–14 to win 20–16.

2020
After the departure of his brother Jayden to Newcastle, Brailey became the Sharks’ first-choice hooker for the 2020 NRL season. Brailey played in 20 games throughout the shortened season, including Cronulla’s elimination final exit.

2021
Brailey played a total of 24 games for Cronulla in the 2021 NRL season which saw the club finish 9th and narrowly miss out on the finals.

2022
Brailey played 26 games for Cronulla in the 2022 NRL season including both of the clubs finals games as they were eliminated in straight sets losing to North Queensland and South Sydney.

Statistics

NRL
 Statistics are correct as of the end of the 2022 season

References

External links

Sharks profile

1998 births
Living people
Australian rugby league players
Cronulla-Sutherland Sharks players
Newtown Jets NSW Cup players
Rugby league hookers
Rugby league players from Sydney